Gheorghe Ghidirim (born 22 April 1939) is a physician from Moldova and a former Health Minister of Moldova in Mircea Druc Cabinet.

He is a member of the Academy of Sciences of Moldova, university professor and Head of “Nicolae Anestiadi” Surgery Chair Nicolae Testemiţanu State University of Medicine and Pharmacy. Gheorghe Ghidirim is the President of Moldovan Surgeons Associations, coordinating-academician of the Health Sciences Section, Editor of Sciences Academy’s Bulletin.

He is a leader of the Democratic Forum of Romanians in Moldova.

Biography
Gheorghe Ghidirim was born on April 22, 1939 in the Palanca commune, Olăneşti, Cetatea-Albă County, Kingdom of Romania. He graduated with honours the Tighina Medical College, then, worked as a feldsher at the Tudora Hospital. Then he continued his studies at the State Medical Institute in Chișinău.

Several medical organizations and institutions in the country and abroad have chosen Gheorghe Ghidirim as honorary member, among them Romanian Society of Surgery, Laparoscopic Surgery Society of Romania, “N. Pirogov” International Society of Surgery in Russia; International Society of Hepato-Bilio-Pancreatic Surgery; World Society of Surgery. At the VIIIth  Congress of Surgeons of the Republic of Moldova he was elected president of the National Surgical Society.

In 1993, Ghidirim was elected as a full member of the Academy of Sciences of Moldova and president of the newly formed Academy of Medicine. In the same year, he became an honorary member of the Academy of Medical Sciences of Romania, and in 1994, he became an honorary member of the Romanian Society of Surgery.
His scientific work includes over 400 scientific papers, 35 monographs, 2 textbooks, and 15 patents.

G. Ghidirim was the MP of the last parliament of the USSR, a member of the government and the Minister of Health. He participated in elaborating of the Declaration of Independence of the Republic of Moldova, and on adopting the anthem, coat of arms and flag of the country.

Awards
 Order of the Republic (Moldova), 2005
 "Nicolae Testemițanu" Medal, 2004
 Order of Work Glory, 2000
 Emeritus of the Republic of Moldova ("Om Emerit al Republicii Moldova"), 1995

References

External links 
 Raportul de activitate al academicianului Ghidirim Gheorghe, profesor universitar, doctor habilitat în științe medicale, pentru anul 2008 
 ACADEMICIANUL GHEORGHE GHIDIRIM LA 70 ANI
 Gheorghe Ghidirim, ex-ministru al sanatatii, academician, profesor ...

Romanian people of Moldovan descent
1939 births
Eastern Orthodox Christians from Romania
Moldovan surgeons
Titular members of the Academy of Sciences of Moldova
People from Ștefan Vodă District
Living people